Jeff Green may refer to:

Arts and entertainment
 Jeff Green (comedian) (born 1964), English comedian and writer
 Jeff Green (multimedia artist) (born 1956), radio, television, and multimedia producer and director
 Jeff Green (writer) (born 1961), former PC gaming editor-in-chief of 1UP.com

Other
 Jeff Green (basketball) (born 1986), American basketball player
 Jeff Green (businessman), co-founder of Trade Desk Inc
 Jeff Green (politician), Conservative politician and former leader of Wirral Council
 Jeff Green (racing driver) (born 1962), NASCAR Xfinity Series driver and 2000 Busch Series champion

See also
 Jeff Greene (born 1954), American real estate entrepreneur
 Jeff Greene (character), fictional character from Curb Your Enthusiasm
 Jeffrey Green, British historian
 Geoffrey Green (disambiguation)